Coñaripe is a Chilean town and resort area, located on the shore of Calafquén Lake. Administratively it belongs to Panguipulli commune in Valdivia Province of Los Ríos Region.

The town is placed at its current position since the older settlement of Coñaripe was destroyed in 1964 when a lahar flow ran over the town. The lahar had been caused by a strombolian eruption in Villarrica Volcano.

See also
 List of towns in Chile

Populated lakeshore places in Chile
Populated places in Valdivia Province